Lake Barrington is a village in Lake County, Illinois, United States. Per the 2020 census, the population was 5,100.

Geography
Lake Barrington is located at  (42.2125330, -88.1680526).

Demographics

2020 census

Note: the US Census treats Hispanic/Latino as an ethnic category. This table excludes Latinos from the racial categories and assigns them to a separate category. Hispanics/Latinos can be of any race.

2000 Census
At the 2000 census there were 4,757 people, 2,039 households, and 1,455 families living in the village of Lake Barrington. The racial makeup of the village was 97.41% White, 0.42% African American, 0.19% Native American, 1.07% Asian, 0.06% Pacific Islander, 0.15% from other races, and 0.69% from two or more races. Hispanic or Latino of any race were 0.99%.

Of the 2,039 households, 23.7% had children under the age of 18 living with them, 65.8% were married couples living together, 3.9% had a female householder with no husband present, and 28.6% were non-families. 25.6% of households were one person and 9.3% were one person aged 65 or older. The average household size was 2.33 and the average family size was 2.80.

The age distribution was 20.4% under the age of 18, 3.5% from 18 to 24, 17.7% from 25 to 44, 40.4% from 45 to 64, and 17.9% 65 or older. The median age was 49 years. For every 100 females, there were 93.6 males. For every 100 females age 18 and over, there were 89.0 males.

The median household income was $106,951 and the median family income  was $122,473. The per capita income for the village was $63,158. About 1.2% of families and 2.0% of the population were below the poverty line, including 3.4% of those under age 18 and 2.3% of those age 65 or over.

References

External links
Village of Lake Barrington official website

Villages in Illinois
Villages in Lake County, Illinois